A partial list of Roman place names in Great Britain.

This list includes only names documented from Roman times. For a more complete list including later Latin names, see List of Latin place names in Britain.

The early sources for Roman names show numerous variants and misspellings of the Latin names. Moreover, one of the principal authorities, Ptolemy, wrote in Greek so names that he records need to be transliterated back into Latin to reveal the original form.

Note that in general only one source is shown below for each name, although many of the names are recorded in more than one of the sources.

Lists

Geographic regions

Settlement names

See also 

 List of Latin place names in Britain
 List of Latin place names in Continental Europe and Ireland
 Latin names of cities
 Latin names of regions
 Latin names of European countries
 History of Britain
 History of Ireland
 Roman sites in the United Kingdom
United Nations Group of Experts on Geographical Names

Primary sources
AI: The Antonine Itinerary
P: Ptolemy's Geography
RC: The Ravenna Cosmography
T: Tacitus's On the Life and Character of Julius Agricola.
SP: Confession of St. Patrick
ND: Notitia Dignitatum

References

External links 
 Dr. J. G. Th. Grässe, Orbis Latinus: Lexikon lateinischer geographischer Namen des Mittelalters und der Neuzeit, online at the Bavarian State Library
Grässe, Orbis Latinus, online at Columbia University
Interpreter List of Roman Place names in Great Britain and Ireland

Roman Britain
Roman place names
Britain
Britain, Roman
Britain
Roman
Place names
 
Britain
Geography of Great Britain

pt:Topónimos romanos no Reino Unido